Matsya 6000 (Sanskrit) is an Indian crewed deep-submergence vehicle intended to be utilised for deep-sea exploration of rare minerals under the Deep Ocean misson. Currently under development, the vehicle would consist of a titanium alloy sphere of 80mm thickness along with a diameter of 2.1m which can withstand the pressure of 600 bar.

History
On 31 August 2019, while replying to a query about deep sea mining, the then director of NIOT (National Institute of Ocean Technology) Dr. M.A. Atmanand, who was at the facility of Titagarh Wagons to inaugurate coastal research vessel Sagar Anveshika, said that in line with the Gaganyaan mission of ISRO, NIOT was proposing a project to send a submersible vehicle with three persons to a depth of about 6000 metres to carry out deep underwater studies. He further added that the success of the "Samudrayaan" mission will help India join the league of developed nations in exploration of minerals from oceans.

The project was supposed to get final approval from the Ministry of Finance in October 2019, but the final approval was delayed and was granted on 16 June 2021.

Development
On 27 October 2021, NIOT conducted an uncrewed trial of the ‘personnel sphere,’ built of mild steel, using the ORV Sagar Nidhi, in Bay of Bengal. For the trial, the personnel sphere was lowered upto a depth of 600 metres, off the coast of Chennai. After successful trial and receiving certification, the union minister of state (independent charge) science and technology Jitendra Singh formally launched the project on 29 October 2021. The entire project was allocated  for a period of five years.

See also
Ictineu 3
Deepsea Challenger
Nautile

References

 
Research submarines
Research submarines of India
Submarines of India
Ship types